General elections were held in Burma over several months between June 1951 and April 1952 due to internal conflict within the country.

The first elections since independence, they saw the Anti-Fascist People's Freedom League (AFPFL) win 60% of the vote and 199 out of 250 seats. Voter turnout was low at 20%, as only 1.5 million voters out of an eligible 8 million participated. It was the lowest turnout for a Burmese election since the 1920s boycotts in colonial Burma.

Results

References

Elections in Myanmar
1952 in Burma
1951 in Burma
Burma
Burma
Election and referendum articles with incomplete results